Versengold is a German folk and neo-medieval band formed in 2003. The originality of their music style is that they combine historical texts with modern folk elements. With ten albums released so far, they have become an integral part of the German folk scene.

Overview

Members

Discography

References

External links 
 
 

German musical groups
Musical groups established in 2003
Pagan-folk musicians
2003 establishments in Germany